Jeffrey Kent Huson (born August 15, 1964) is a former Major League Baseball utility player.  He is an alumnus of the University of Wyoming.

Signed by the Montreal Expos as an amateur free agent in 1985, Huson made his Major League Baseball debut with the Expos on September 2, 1988, and appeared in his final game on October 1, 2000. He played 3B in the Cal Ripken Jr. 2,131 consecutive record game.

Huson is a color analysis commentator for the Colorado Rockies.

References

https://www.baseball-almanac.com/box-scores/boxscore.php?boxid=199509060BAL

External links
 Bio on MLB.com/Rockies
 Page at Baseball Reference

1964 births
Living people
American expatriate baseball players in Canada
Anaheim Angels players
Baltimore Orioles players
Baseball players from Scottsdale, Arizona
Bowie Baysox players
Burlington Expos players
Chicago Cubs players
Colorado Rockies announcers
Colorado Springs Sky Sox players
Frederick Keys players
Glendale Gauchos baseball players
Indianapolis Indians players
Jacksonville Expos players
Major League Baseball infielders
Milwaukee Brewers players
Montreal Expos players
Oklahoma City 89ers players
Rochester Red Wings players
Seattle Mariners players
Texas Rangers players
Tucson Sidewinders players
West Palm Beach Expos players
Wyoming Cowboys baseball players